Phytoecia maculicollis is a species of beetle in the family Cerambycidae. It was described by Péringuey in 1888, originally under the genus Nitocris.

References

Phytoecia
Beetles described in 1888